A list of people, who died during the 11th century, who have received recognition as Blessed (through beatification) or Saint (through canonization) from the Catholic Church:

See also 
The Editors of Encyclopaedia Britannica. (2020). 'Vladimir I'. Retrieved from https://www.britannica.com/biography/Vladimir-I

Behind the Name. (2020). 'Andrew of Strumi'. Retrieved from https://www.behindthename.com/namesakes/3367

Christianity in the 11th century
11th century saints
Christianity saints finder

Footnotes 

11
11
Saint